James Allen Harker FLS (31 July 1847 – 19 December 1894) was an English entomologist, professor of natural history at the Royal Agricultural College in Cirencester, Gloucestershire from 1881 until his death.

He was a fellow of the Linnean Society from 1883. He was also a sometime correspondent of Charles Darwin.

He married in 1885 Lizzie Watson. Their sons were Oswald Allen Harker CBE (1886–1968) and Arthur William Allen Harker CBE (1890-1960).  He died in 1894. After his death his widow had a successful career as an author.

References

1847 births
1894 deaths
Fellows of the Linnean Society of London